Annesley Bridge crosses the River Tolka in Fairview, Dublin, Ireland. It is named after Richard Annesley, 6th Earl of Anglesey. The East Wall Road, North Strand Road and Poplar Row meet at the west end of the bridge with Annesley Bridge Road at the east end, making it an important junction in the north inner city.

History 
Building of the original bridge commenced in 1792 by aristocrat Richard Annesley, and opened to the public in 1797. A decorative silver trowel given to him during the opening ceremony was later auctioned and displayed in the Dublin Civic Museum. 

During the Rising of 1916, the bridge became the location and namesake of the Battle of Annesley Bridge.  Ten years later in 1926, the original bridge was demolished and rebuilt as the structure that stands today.

References

External links
 The Battle of Annesley Bridge

Bridges in Dublin (city)
Bridges completed in 1797
Bridges completed in 1926
1926 establishments in Ireland